Jedit X is a commercial text editor made in Japan by Artman21. It is a complete re-write of Jedit 4.0 in the Cocoa API. Jedit has been around since 1995 and is a general purpose text editor, with extra features related to supporting the Japanese language. It is available in both English and Japanese localizations.

External links
 Jedit X official site

MacOS-only software
MacOS text editors
MacOS word processors